Vakil is a surname. Notable people with the surname include:

Abhay Vakil (born 1951), Indian businessman
Ardashir Vakil, Indian novelist
Dina Vakil (born 1946), Indian journalist
Pandit Divyang Vakil, Indian spiritual teacher
Jehangir Vakil, Indian actor
Laila Vakil (born 1974), British swimmer
Nanubhai Vakil (1902–1980), Indian film director
Ravi Vakil (born 1970), Canadian-American mathematician
Shereveer Vakil, Indian actor and gym trainer
Tarjani Vakil, Indian banker